Chaves County is a county in New Mexico, United States. As of the 2020 census, the population was 65,157. Its county seat is Roswell. Chaves County was named for Colonel Jose Francisco Chaves, a military leader there during the Civil War and later in Navajo campaigns. The county was created by the New Mexico Territorial Legislature on February 25, 1889, out of land from Lincoln County.

Chaves County comprises the Roswell, New Mexico Micropolitan Statistical Area.

Geography
It is the fourth-largest county in New Mexico by area.

Adjacent counties
 De Baca County - north
 Roosevelt County - northeast
 Lea County - east
 Eddy County - south
 Otero County - southwest
 Lincoln County - west

National protected areas
 Bitter Lake National Wildlife Refuge
 Lincoln National Forest (part)

Demographics

2000 census
As of the 2000 census, there were 61,382 people, 22,561 households, and 16,085 families living in the county. The population density was 10 people per square mile (4/km2). There were 25,647 housing units at an average density of 4 per square mile (2/km2). The racial makeup of the county was 71.95% White, 1.97% Black or African American, 1.13% Native American, 0.53% Asian, 0.06% Pacific Islander, 21.25% from other races, and 3.12% from two or more races. 43.83% of the population were Hispanic or Latino of any race.

There were 22,561 households, out of which 35.60% had children under the age of 18 living with them, 52.70% were married couples living together, 13.70% had a female householder with no husband present, and 28.70% were non-families. 24.80% of all households were made up of individuals, and 11.60% had someone living alone who was 65 years of age or older. The average household size was 2.66 and the average family size was 3.17.

In the county, the population was spread out, with 29.10% under the age of 18, 9.40% from 18 to 24, 25.30% from 25 to 44, 21.50% from 45 to 64, and 14.70% who were 65 years of age or older. The median age was 35 years. For every 100 females there were 95.90 males. For every 100 females age 18 and over, there were 91.60 males.

The median income for a household in the county was $28,513, and the median income for a family was $32,532. Males had a median income of $26,896 versus $21,205 for females. The per capita income for the county was $14,990. About 17.60% of families and 21.30% of the population were below the poverty line, including 29.10% of those under age 18 and 13.90% of those age 65 or over.

2010 census
As of the 2010 census, there were 65,645 people, 23,691 households, and 16,646 families living in the county. The racial makeup of the county was 70.9% white, 2.0% black or African American, 1.2% American Indian, 0.6% Asian, 0.1% Pacific islander, 21.9% from other races, and 3.2% from two or more races. Those of Hispanic or Latino origin made up 52.0% of the population. In terms of ancestry, 10.1% were German, 9.3% were Irish, 8.5% were English, and 4.6% were American.

Of the 23,691 households, 37.7% had children under the age of 18 living with them, 48.9% were married couples living together, 14.9% had a female householder with no husband present, 29.7% were non-families, and 25.2% of all households were made up of individuals. The average household size was 2.70 and the average family size was 3.22. The median age was 34.7 years.

The median income for a household in the county was $37,524 and the median income for a family was $43,464. Males had a median income of $37,573 versus $26,250 for females. The per capita income for the county was $18,504. About 15.9% of families and 21.0% of the population were below the poverty line, including 27.1% of those under age 18 and 14.6% of those age 65 or over.

Politics
Chaves County is a Republican stronghold. No Democratic presidential candidate has won Chaves County since Lyndon Johnson's landslide victory of 1964. Even in that election, Johnson took Chaves County by only 1.3 percent.

Communities

City
 Roswell (county seat)

Towns
 Dexter
 Hagerman
 Lake Arthur

Census-designated place
 Midway

Unincorporated communities
 Dunken
 Elk
 Elkins
 Greenfield
 Mesa

Education
School districts include:
 Artesia Public Schools
 Dexter Consolidated Schools
 Elida Municipal Schools
 Hagerman Municipal Schools
 Lake Arthur Municipal Schools
 Roswell Independent Schools
 Tatum Municipal Schools

Notable people
 

Jacqueline Wonsetler (1918–1974), American meteorologist

See also

 National Register of Historic Places listings in Chaves County, New Mexico

References

External links

 
1889 establishments in New Mexico Territory
Populated places established in 1889